Thule Air Base (pronounced  or ,), or Thule Air Base/Pituffik Airport , is the United States Space Force's northernmost base, and the northernmost installation of the U.S. Armed Forces, located  north of the Arctic Circle and  from the North Pole on the northwest coast of the island of Greenland. Thule's arctic environment includes icebergs in North Star Bay, two islands (Saunders Island and Wolstenholme Island), a polar ice sheet, and Wolstenholme Fjord – the only place on Earth where four active glaciers join together. The base is home to a substantial portion of the global network of missile warning sensors of Space Delta 4, and space surveillance and space control sensors of Space Delta 2, providing space awareness and advanced missile detection capabilities to North American Aerospace Defense Command (NORAD), the United States Space Force, and joint partners.

Thule Air Base is also home to the 821st Air Base Group and is responsible for air base support within the Thule Defense Area for the multinational population of "Team Thule". The base hosts the 12th Space Warning Squadron (12 SWS) which operates a Ballistic Missile Early Warning System (BMEWS) designed to detect and track ICBMs launched against North America. Thule is also host to Detachment 1 of the 23rd Space Operations Squadron, part of the Space Delta 6's global satellite control network. The airfield's  runway handles more than 3,000 US and international flights per year. Finally, Thule is home to the northernmost deep water port in the world.

Thule Air Base has served as the regional hub for nearby installations, including Cape Atholl (LORAN station), Camp Century (Ice Cap Camp), Camp TUTO (Ice Cap Approach Ramp and Airstrip), Sites 1 and 2 (Ice Cap Radar Stations), P-Mountain (radar and communications site), J-Site (BMEWS), North and South Mountains (research sites), and a research rocket firing site. It also was essential in the construction and resupply of High Arctic weather stations, including CFS Alert (Alert Airport) and Station Nord.

Name

"Thule" is named for Thule, an ancient Greek place name dating to the third-century BC for a land believed to lie to the north of Britain, and the Latin phrase Ultima Thule (Latin, "farthest Thule"), the ancient Roman concept of a northernmost locale beyond the borders of the known world.  However, unlike the Greek (and English) pronunciation of soft th, the name of the air base is pronounced using the Danish initial hard t.

History

Location and original population
In 1818, Sir John Ross's expedition made first contact with nomadic Inuktun in the area. James Saunders's expedition aboard HMS North Star was marooned in North Star Bay 1849–50 and named landmarks. Robert Peary built a support station by a protected harbor at the foot of iconic Mount Dundas in 1892. It served as a base camp for his expeditions and attracted a permanent population. In 1910 explorer Knud Rasmussen established a missionary and trading post there. He called the site "Thule" after classical ultima Thule; the Inuit called it Umanaq ("heart-shaped"), and the site is commonly called "Dundas" today. The United States abandoned its territorial claims in the area in 1917 in connection with the purchase of the Virgin Islands. Denmark assumed control of the village in 1937.

A cluster of huts known as Pituffik ("the place the dogs are tied") stood on the wide plain where the base was built in 1951. (A main base street was named Pituffik Boulevard.) The affected locals moved to Thule. In a Danish Supreme Court judgment of 28 November 2003 the move was considered an expropriative intervention. During the proceedings it was recognized by the Danish government that the movement was a serious interference and an unlawful act against the local population. The Thule tribe was awarded damages of 500,000 kroner, and the individual members of the tribe who had been exposed to the transfer were granted compensation of 15,000 or 25,000 each. A Danish radio station continued to operate at Dundas, and the abandoned houses remained. The USAF only used that site for about a decade, and it has since returned to civilian use.

Knud Rasmussen was the first to recognize the Pituffik plain as ideal for an airport. USAAF Colonel Bernt Balchen, who built Sondrestrom Air Base, knew Rasmussen and his idea. Balchen led a flight of two Consolidated PBY Catalina flying boats to Thule on 24 August 1942 and then sent a report advocating an air base to USAAF chief Henry "Hap" Arnold. However, the 1951 air base site is a few miles inland from the original 1946 airstrip and across the bay from the historical Thule settlement, to which it is connected by an ice road. The joint Danish-American defense area, designated by treaty, also occupies considerable inland territory in addition to the air base itself.

World War II
After the German occupation of Denmark on 9 April 1940, Henrik Kauffmann, Danish Ambassador to the United States, made an agreement "In the name of the king" with the United States, authorizing the United States to defend the Danish colonies on Greenland from German aggression – this agreement faced Kauffmann with a charge of high treason by the protectorate Government. The first US-sponsored installations at Thule were established after the US Secretary of State Cordell Hull and the defected Danish Minister to the United States Henrik Kauffmann signed The Agreement relating to the Defense of Greenland in Washington, D.C. on the symbolically chosen date of 9 April 1941. The treaty, denounced by the Danish government, allowed the United States to operate military bases in Greenland "for as long as there is agreement" that the threat to North America existed. Beginning in the summer of 1941, the US Coast Guard and the War Department established weather and radio stations at Narsarsuaq Airport (Bluie West-1), Sondrestrom Air Base (Bluie West-8), Ikateq (Bluie East Two), and Gronnedal (Bluie West-9). In 1943 the Army Air Forces set up weather stations Scoresbysund (Bluie East-3) on the east coast around the southern tip of Greenland, and Thule (Bluie West-6) to be operated by Danish personnel. Many other sites were set up, but BW-6, isolated in the far North, was then of very minor importance.

Joint weather station
After liberation, Denmark ratified the Kauffmann treaty but began efforts to take over US installations. Nonetheless, in summer 1946, the radio and weather station was enhanced with a gravel airstrip and an upper-air (balloon) observatory. This was part of an American-Canadian initiative to construct joint weather stations in the High Arctic. This station was under joint US-Danish operation. The location changed from the civilian village at Thule (Dundas) to mainland Pittufik. In 1946–1951, the airstrip played an important role in Arctic resupply, aerial mapping, research, and search-and rescue.

The ratification of the treaty in 1951 did not change much, except that the Danish national flag must be side by side with the US national flag on the base.

Modern air base
In 1949, Denmark joined NATO (North Atlantic Treaty Organization) and abandoned its attempt to remove the United States bases. By the outbreak of the Korean War next year, the USAF embarked on a global program of base-building in which Thule (at the time) would be considered the crown jewel owing to its location across the Pole from the USSR, as well as its merit of being the northernmost port to be reliably resupplied by ship. Thule became a key point in American nuclear retaliation strategy. Strategic Air Command (SAC) bombers flying over the Arctic presented less risk of early warning than using bases in the United Kingdom. Defensively, Thule could serve as a base for intercepting bomber attacks along the northeastern approaches to Canada and the US.

A board of Air Force officers headed by Gordon P. Saville made a recommendation to pursue a base at Thule in November 1950. It was subsequently supported by the Joint Chiefs of Staff and approved by President Truman. To replace the agreement entered into during World War II between the US and Denmark, a new agreement with respect to Greenland was ratified on 27 April 1951 (effective on 8 June 1951). At the request of NATO, the agreement became a part of the NATO defense program. The pact specified that the two nations would arrange for the use of facilities in Greenland by NATO forces in defense of the NATO area known as the Greenland Defense Area.

Thule AB was constructed in secret under the code name Operation Blue Jay, but the project was made public in September 1952. Construction for Thule AB began in 1951 and was completed in 1953. The construction of Thule is said to have been comparable in scale to the enormous effort required to build the Panama Canal.  The United States Navy transported the bulk of men, supplies, and equipment from the naval shipyards in Norfolk, Virginia. On 6 June 1951 an armada of 120 ships sailed from Naval Station Norfolk. On board were 12,000 men and 300,000 tons of cargo. They arrived at Thule on 9 July 1951. Construction, aided by continuous daylight in summer, took place around the clock. The workers lived on board the ships until quarters were built. Once they moved into the quarters, the ships returned home.

On 16 June 1951, the base was accidentally discovered by French cultural anthropologist and geographer Jean Malaurie and his Inuit friend Kutikitsoq, on their way back from the geomagnetic North Pole.

Strategic Air Command

Originally established as a Strategic Air Command installation, Thule would periodically serve as a dispersal base for B-36 Peacemaker and B-47 Stratojet aircraft during the 1950s, as well as providing an ideal site to test the operability and maintainability of these weapon systems in extreme cold weather. Similar operations were also conducted with B-52 Stratofortress aircraft in the 1950s and 1960s.

In 1954, the  Globecom Tower, a tower for military radio communication, was built at Northmountain. At the time of its completion it was the third tallest man-made structure on earth and the tallest structure north of the Arctic Circle in the Western hemisphere.

In the winter of 1956/57 three KC-97 tankers and alternately one of two RB-47H aircraft made polar flights to inspect Soviet defenses. After a two-hour head start, a B-47 would catch up with them at the northeast coastline of Greenland where two would offload fuel to top off the B-47's tanks (the third was an air spare). The B-47 would then fly seven hours of reconnaissance, while the tankers would return to Thule, refuel, and three would again fly to rendezvous with the returning B-47 at northeast Greenland. In that case the three tankers and the B-47 had to additionally fly to one of three equidistant alternates: England, Alaska, or Labrador. All of this sometimes took place in moonless, 24-hour Arctic darkness, December through February. These flights demonstrated the capabilities of the US Strategic Air Command to Soviet Anti-Air Defense.

Carved into the ice, and powered by a nuclear reactor, PM-2A Camp Century was officially a scientific research base, but in reality was the site of the top secret Project Iceworm. The camp operated from 1959 until 1967.

In the late 1950s, the DEW 1 to 4 were built as "weather stations". Thule Air Base would act as a supply station for the DYE bases.

Aerospace defense
In 1957 construction began on four Nike Missile sites around the base, and they and their radar systems were operational by the end of 1958.

BMEWS was developed by the RCA Corporation in order to provide North America warning of a transpolar missile attack from the Russian mainland and submarine-launched missiles from the Arctic and North Atlantic oceans. At this time, Thule was at its peak with a population of about 10,000. Starting in July 1965, there was a general downsizing of activities at Thule. The base host unit, the 4683d Air Defense Wing, was discontinued. By January 1968, the population of Thule was down to 3,370. On 21 January 1968, a B-52G bomber carrying four nuclear weapons crashed just outside Thule – see below.

Air Force Space Command from 1982 to 2019

Thule became an Air Force Space Command base in 1982. Today Thule is home to the 821st Air Base Group, which exercises Air Base support responsibilities within the Thule Defense Area. The base hosts the 12th Space Warning Squadron (21st Operations Group, 21st Space Wing), a Ballistic Missile Early Warning Site designed to detect and track ICBMs launched against North America. Missile warning and space surveillance information flows to NORAD command centers located at Peterson Space Force Base, Colorado. Thule is also host to Detachment 1 of the 23rd Space Operations Squadron, part of the 50th Space Wing's global satellite control network, as well as operating many new weapons systems. In addition, the airfield boasts a  asphalt runway, with 3,000 US and international flights per year.

A delegation from the NATO Parliamentary Assembly visited Thule in early September 2010 and were told by the base commander that, at that time (summer), approximately 600 personnel were serving at Thule, a mix of mostly US and Danish active duty personnel and contractors.

There is only a brief period each year in the summer when sea ice thins sufficiently to send supply ships to the base. The US sends one heavy supply ship each summer in what is called Operation Pacer Goose.

Space Force Command from 2020 
In 2020, Thule was formally reorganized under the control of the United States Space Force.

Major commands to which assigned
 Northeast Air Command, 1 July 19511 April 1957
 Strategic Air Command
 Eighth Air Force, 1 April 19571 July 1960
 Air Defense Command (later redesignated Aerospace Defense Command) 15 January 1968, 1 July 19601 December 1979
 Strategic Air Command, 1 December 197930 September 1992
 Air Force Space Command, 30 September 199220 December 2019
 United States Space Force, 20 December 2019 - Present

Major air units assigned

 
 6622d Air Base Squadron, 20 July 1951
 Redesignated: 6612th Air Base Group, 1 January 1952
 Redesignated: 6607th Air Base Wing, 1 June 19541 April 1957
 318th Fighter Interceptor Squadron, 1 July 19535 August 1954
 74th Fighter-Interceptor Squadron, 20 August 195425 June 1958
 320th Air Refueling Squadron, 4 May 195510 June 1957
 Detached from 320th Bombardment Wing, March AFB, California
 509th Air Refueling Squadron, c. 17 June 1955c. 3 August 1955
 Detached from 509th Bombardment Wing, Walker AFB, New Mexico
 96th Air Refueling Squadron, 13 July 195514 September 1955
 Detached from 96th Bombardment Wing, Altus AFB, Oklahoma
 26th Air Refueling Squadron, 9 September 19552 November 1955; 5 September 195615 December 1956
 Detached from 380th Bombardment Wing, Plattsburgh AFB, New York
 42d Air Refueling Squadron, 2 November 195528 December 1955; 1 January 19577 March 1957
 Detached from 42d Bombardment Wing, Loring AFB, Maine
 71st Air Refueling Squadron, 29 December 195527 March 1956
 Detached from 2d Bombardment Wing, Barksdale AFB, Louisiana
 341st Air Refueling Squadron, 27 March 195626 June 1956
 Detached from 341st Bombardment Wing, Dyess AFB, Texas
 40th Air Refueling Squadron, 27 June 19564 September 1956; c. 1 October 1958January, 9 1959
 Detached from 40th Bombardment Wing, Smoky Hill AFB, Kansas

 340th Air Refueling Squadron, 29 October 195630 December 1956
 Detached from 340th Bombardment Wing, Whiteman AFB, Missouri
  100th Air Refueling Squadron c. 2 Jan 19582 Apr 1958, Detached from 100th Bomb Wing Pease AFB New Hampshire
  509th Air Refueling Squadron c. 3 Apr 19584 Jul 1959, Detached from 509th Bomb Wing Pease AFB New Hampshire
 4083d Strategic Wing, 1 April 19571 July 1959
 4083d Air Base Group, 1 April 1957
 Redesignated: 4083d Air Base Wing, 1 July 1960
 Redesignated: 4083d Air Base Group, 1 October 1960
 Redesignated: 4683d Combat Support Group, 1 July 1965
 Redesignated: 4683d Air Base Group, 1 July 19701 October 1977
 4683d Air Defense Wing, 1 July 19601 July 1965
 327th Fighter-Interceptor Squadron, 3 July 195825 March 1960
 332d Fighter-Interceptor Squadron, 1 September 19601 July 1965
 OL-5, 6594th Test Wing (Satellite), Air Force Systems Command, 15 October 1961
 Redesignated: 22nd Space Operations Squadron, 1 June 1997
 Redesignated: Det 3, 22d Space Operations Squadron, 1 May 2004
 Redesignated: Det 1, 23d Space Operations Squadron, 1 October 2010 – present
 12th Missile Warning Group, 31 March 1977
 Redesignated: 12th Missile Warning Squadron, 15 June 1983
 Redesignated: 12th Missile Warning Group, 1 October 1989
 Redesignated: 12th Space Warning Squadron, 15 May 1992 – present 
 4711th Air Base Squadron, 31 March 1977
 Redesignated: 4685th Air Base Squadron, 1 October 198031 March 1981
 821st Air Base Group, 1 June 2002present

Major Army units assigned
 4th Battalion, 55th Artillery, 1 Sep 195820 Dec 1965. (Nike)
 7th Anti-Aircraft Artillery Group, 1 July 1955 – 20 December 1965 (Redesignated 7th Artillery Group 20 March 1958) [A, B, C, and D Batteries 90mm AAA cannon; 549th 75mm AAA BN (Sky Sweeper); 51st Ordnance Company]

Remote tracking station
Thule Tracking Station (TTS) is operated by Thule Air Base, using the callsign POGO. The station ) is a U.S. Space Force installation in Greenland, near the base, and has a Remote Tracking Station (callsign: Polar Orbiting Geophysical Observatory (POGO)) of the Satellite Control Network. 

It was originally the classified 6594th Test Wing's Operating Location 5 designated by Air Force Systems Command on 15 October 1961: the station was operational on 30 March 1962, with "transportable antenna vans parked in an old Strategic Air Command bomb assembly building." 
The permanent RTS equipment was emplaced in 1964, and a communications terminal was emplaced on Pingarssuit Mountain—Thule Site N-32 (moved to Thule Site J in 1983.

Accidents
In 1954 a Douglas C-124C Globemaster II operated by the US Air Force crashed on approach to the air base, killing ten people.

B-52 nuclear bomber crash (1968)

On 21 January 1968, a B-52G Stratofortress from the 380th Strategic Aerospace Wing, Plattsburgh Air Force Base, New York, on a secret airborne nuclear alert crashed and burned on the ice near Thule Air Base. The impact detonated the high explosives in the primary units of all four of the B28 nuclear bombs it carried, but nuclear and thermonuclear reactions did not take place due to the PAL and fail-safe mechanisms in the weapons, thus preventing the actual detonation of the weapons themselves. The resulting fire caused extensive radioactive contamination. More than 700 Danish civilians and US military personnel worked under hazardous conditions, the former without protective gear, to clean up the nuclear waste. In 1987, nearly 200 of the Danish workers tried unsuccessfully to sue the United States. Kaare Ulbak, chief consultant to the Danish National Institute of Radiation Hygiene, said Denmark had carefully studied the health of the Thule workers and found no evidence of increased mortality or cancer.

The Pentagon maintained that all four weapons had been destroyed. Although many of the details of the accident are still classified, some information was released by the US authorities under the Freedom of Information Act. After reviewing these files, an investigative reporter from BBC News claimed in May 2007 that the USAF was unable to account for one of the weapons. In 2009, the assertions of the BBC were refuted by a Danish report after a review of the available declassified documentation.

Airlines and destinations

Airlines 

As of 2010, one airline provided commercial service to Thule.

Cargo Shipping
Ocean Transportation is provided by Schuyler Line Navigation Company, a US Flag Ocean Carrier.  Schuyler Line operates under government contract to supply sustainment and building supplies to the Base.

Geography
Thule has a tundra climate (ET) with long, severely cold winters lasting most of the year and short and cool summers. Precipitation is very low year round, but peaks during summer. The structures of the base are built on permafrost which makes them vulnerable to the effects of Climate change.

See also
 Etah, Greenland
 Annoatok
 Eastern Air Defense Force (Air Defense Command)
 Thule people
 Kee Bird
 Camp Fistclench
 Camp Century
 Gerald Gustafson

Further reading

 Maria Ackrén. 2019. "From bilateral to trilateral agreement: The case of Thule Air Base." Arctic Yearbook 2019.

References

Other sources

 

 Balchen, Bernt. Come North With Me. EP Dutton, New York, 1958.
 Maurer, Maurer. Air Force Combat Units of World War II. Washington, DC: U.S. Government Printing Office 1961 (republished 1983, Office of Air Force History).
 Ravenstein, Charles A. Air Force Combat Wings Lineage and Honors Histories 1947–1977. Maxwell Air Force Base, Alabama: Office of Air Force History 1984. .
 Fletcher, Harry R. (1989) Air Force Bases Volume II, Active Air Force Bases outside the United States of America on 17 September 1982. Maxwell AFB, Alabama: Office of Air Force History.

External links

 www.thule.af.mil
 Thule Air Base, Greenland — Space Base Delta 1
 
 The Ultimate Guide to Thule Air Base
 Joergen Dragsdahl (2005) US-Danish politics on Thule Air Base: A few dilemmas bypassed in Denmark and Greenland
Photos
 Greenland Photos and Stories from Thule Air Base
 
 
weather
 Current weather conditions at Thule Air Base, Greenland
 
 Thule weather CCTV feed

Airports in the Arctic
Installations of the United States Air Force in Greenland
Airports in Greenland
Baffin Bay
Airfields of the United States Army Air Forces in Greenland
Installations of Strategic Air Command
Military airbases established in 1953
1953 establishments in Denmark
1950s establishments in Greenland